Molla Nur Mohammad (also Romanized as Mollā Nūr Moḩammad) is a village in Qorqori Rural District, Qorqori District, Hirmand County, Sistan and Baluchestan Province, Iran. At the 2006 census, its population was 232, in 43 families.

References 

Populated places in Hirmand County